This is a list of banks operating in Poland, based on supervisory by Polish Financial Supervision Authority (Komisja Nadzoru Finansowego) and/or member of Polish Bank Association (Związek Banków Polskich)

Development bank

Bank Gospodarstwa Krajowego

Commercial and retail banks

Mortgage banks

Branch of foreign banks
All corporate names ended with "Oddział w Polsce".

Defunct banks

Idea Bank (taken over by Bank Pekao in 2021)
Mercedes-Benz Bank Polska (liquidated)

References

See also 
 List of banks
 List of Polish companies
 Banking, Finance and Insurance Commission

Poland

Banks
Poland